Turón is one of 15 parishes (administrative divisions) in Mieres, a municipality within the province and autonomous community of Asturias, in northern Spain.

Villages and hamlets

References

Parishes in Mieres